Endeavour Field (also known by its commercial name PointsBet Stadium and colloquially as Shark Park during Cronulla Sharks matches) is a rugby league stadium in the southern Sydney suburb of Woolooware, New South Wales, Australia. It is the home ground of the Cronulla-Sutherland Rugby League Club, which represents the Cronulla and Sutherland Shire areas in the National Rugby League competition. The Sharks are as of 2023 just one of two professional sporting clubs in Australia (excluding the Australian Football League's ownership of Docklands Stadium) that own and operate their home ground (alongside the Dolphins via their parent club Redcliffe who compete in the QRL with their home ground, Kayo Stadium) as well as Western United's future home ground Wyndham City Stadium. The Sharkies Leagues Club sits beside the stadium.

History
The stadium was built in 1960 and currently has a capacity of 20,000.

The Cronulla-Sutherland Rugby League Club own the stadium and Leagues Club next door, one of only two NRL clubs to own their own stadium. Local councils usually own sporting venues in Australia.

On 21 April 2006, the Federal Government announced a A$9.6 million grant would be given to the Cronulla Sharks to upgrade the stadium. The upgrade included a new covered stand to seat over 1,500 spectators at the southern end. The new stand was completed in time for the 2008 season.

Renovations are also planned for the ET Stand, named for Cronulla club legend and games record holder Andrew Ettingshausen, and the Peter Burns Stand.

As of June 2020, the Leagues Club is undergoing redevelopment with the Leagues Club closing its doors on 15 December 2019, with the facility originally due to reopen in early 2022. Due to the COVID-19 pandemic impacting construction timelines in the Leagues Club site, the completion date has been pushed back to early 2023, but Cronulla returned to playing home games at the stadium again in 2022 with a temporary capacity of 12,000 in place until mid-2023.

Ground usage

Rugby league
In the NRL competition, the Cronulla-Sutherland Sharks team has been playing at this venue since midway through the 1968 NSWRFL season, which was the club's second season into the competition (they had previously played at Sutherland Oval from 1967 until 1968).

High turnout in crowd numbers are usual when Cronulla play local-derby rivals, the St George Illawarra Dragons. The ground attendance record is 22,302, which was set when Cronulla-Sutherland took on St George in May 2004.

In late 2017, the ground hosted the 2017 Women's Rugby League World Cup tournament. It played host to the group stages and semi-finals matches. The grand final was held at Suncorp Stadium.

During the 2019 NRL season, it was announced that the ground and the Cronulla leagues club would be undergoing renovations and as a result Cronulla revealed that for the next two years that they would be playing home matches away from their spiritual home with Kogarah Oval, WIN Stadium and the new Western Sydney Stadium as new temporary home grounds.

Soccer
The Sydney Olympic FC club played at the ground for two seasons, from 2001 until 2003, in the former National Soccer League.

Naming rights
The ground has had numerous naming rights deals. Names of this ground over the years have been:
 Endeavour Field
 Ronson Field
 Caltex Field
 Shark Park
 Toyota Park
 Toyota Stadium 
 Remondis Stadium
 Southern Cross Group Stadium
 PointsBet Stadium

Gallery

See also
 List of sports venues with the name Toyota

References 

1960 establishments in Australia
Rugby league stadiums in Australia
Sports venues in Sydney
Sports venues completed in 1960
Cronulla-Sutherland Sharks